Bolingbrook's Clow International Airport   is a public airport in Bolingbrook, a village in Will County, Illinois, United States. Located 29 miles (46 km) southwest of the Chicago Loop, it is a small general aviation facility catering to private pilots, students, and commuter aircraft.

History
The airport was originally a grass airstrip built by Oliver Boyd Clow in the 1950s. By 1989 it was named the best privately owned, public-use airport in Illinois. It was acquired by the Village of Bolingbrook in 2004. The village has expanded the airport, which includes a widened runway, additional taxiways, and landing glidepath lighting.

The airport was used as a location for the 1992 film Folks! with Tom Selleck and Don Ameche, which included a cameo by Clow, the founder of the airport.

Clow called the airport "Clow International" on the spur of the moment when filing a flight plan. He chose the word "international" to reflect Chicago's mixed ethnicity, rather than the airport's size: his many friends and fellow pilots were of German, Polish, and other ethnic backgrounds now making their homes in Chicago. "It was named on a lark and borders on the ridiculous, but people remember it. Sometimes the absurd is easier to remember," said Clow.

The airport received $2.4 million from the Illinois Department of Transportation during the COVID-19 pandemic as part of the Rebuild Illinois program. The money went toward replacing a taxiway and the airport's rotating beacon.

Facilities and aircraft 

For the 12-month period ending July 31, 2020, the airport had 50,000 aircraft operations, an average of 137 per day: 96% general aviation and 4% air taxi. For the same time period, there were 59 aircraft based at this airport: 54 single-engine and 4 multi-engine airplanes, and 1 helicopter.

The fixed-base operator (FBO) at Clow is JW Aviation. It offers fuel, aircraft parking and hangars, flight training, and aircraft rental.

Illinois Aviation Museum
The airport is also the location of the Illinois Aviation Museum at Bolingbrook, which includes a collection of restored and replica aircraft.

Accidents and incidents
On September 25, 2013, a Cirrus SR20 airplane crashed after the pilot attempted a go-around. The plane had two occupants; both were killed.

References

External links 

Bolingbrook's Clow International Airport is at 
 Illinois Aviation Museum
 JW Aviation

Airports in Will County, Illinois
Airports in Illinois
Bolingbrook, Illinois